Martin Hammond (born 15 November 1944) is an English classical scholar and former public school headmaster.

Early life
Hammond was educated at Rossall Junior School, Winchester College and Balliol College, Oxford, where he took his first degree in Literae Humaniores, the Oxford course in Latin and Greek Literature, Roman and Greek history, and Ancient and Modern philosophy.

Career
Hammond became a schoolmaster at Eton College, where he became head of Classics for six years and subsequently Master in College. He was Boris Johnson's housemaster, and some critical comments he made in Johnson's house report are often quoted.

Hammond gained his first appointment as a Headmaster at the City of London School and then transferred as head to Tonbridge School. After retiring, he served as a governor of Culford School in Suffolk.

He has translated numerous classical works, including Homer's Iliad (1987) and Odyssey (2000) and Marcus Aurelius's Meditations and Thucydides' History of the Peloponnesian War, and Flavius Josephus' The Jewish War (ISBN 978-0-19-964602-9 (2017)).

Publications

Translations
Homer, The Iliad
Homer, The Odyssey
Thucydides, History of the Peloponnesian War
Marcus Aurelius, Meditations
Arrian, The Anabasis of Alexander
Arrian, Indica

References

People educated at Winchester College
Alumni of Balliol College, Oxford
Heads of schools in England
Living people
Translators of Homer
Teachers at Eton College
1944 births